Biovision is a not-for-profit organisation involved in ecological and sustainable development projects for people living in Africa.

The organization was founded in 1998 by Swiss entomologist Hans Rudolf Herren, with the goal of preserve Africa's natural environment and sustainable improvements in living conditions of African. Zurich and seeks to bring about sustainable improvements in the living conditions of people in Africa and preserve the natural environment as the basis for life. In 2004, Herren established the Biovision Foundation. Some of its focus country are Kenya, Ethiopia, Tanzania and Uganda.

References

Environmental organisations based in Switzerland
Organisations based in Zürich